Sir Ninian Martin Stephen  (15 June 1923 – 29 October 2017) was an Australian judge who served as the 20th governor-general of Australia, in office from 1982 to 1989. He was previously a justice of the High Court of Australia from 1972 to 1982.

Stephen was born in England to Scottish parents. As a child he lived for periods in France, Germany, Scotland, and Switzerland, eventually arriving in Australia at the age of 16. Stephen served with the Australian Army during World War II, and after the war entered the legal profession. He became one of Australia's leading constitutional lawyers. Stephen was appointed to the Supreme Court of Victoria in 1970, and then to the High Court in 1972, aged 48. He was considered a member of the court's "moderate centre". In 1982, Stephen was appointed governor-general on the recommendation of Malcolm Fraser. He approved two double dissolutions during his time in office, the only governor-general to do so. After his term expired, Stephen remained active in public life as a conservationist and member of various international tribunals. He died at the age of 94, making him Australia's longest-lived governor-general.

Early life
Stephen was born in Nettlebed, Oxfordshire, England, to Scottish parents, Barbara (née Cruickshank) and Frederick Brown Stephen. His father, a chauffeur, poultry farmer and motorcycle courier in the First World War, left the family shortly after his birth, emigrating to Canada and starting a new family; his son was told that he had died, and did not learn the truth until 2003. Stephen's mother, formerly a lady's maid was a paid companion for Nina Mylne, the wealthy heiress of the Queensland pastoralist Graham Mylne; his given name was in her honour. During his early childhood, the three of them lived for periods in Switzerland (Geneva where he was christened and Montreaux), France (Paris, Cannes, and Saint-Cast-le-Guildo) and Germany (Wiesbaden), where Mylne took him to Nuremberg for the 1938 Reichsparteitag Grossdeutschland (5-12 September) which he photographed. They eventually moved to Edinburgh in 1929 so Stephen could begin his formal schooling.

Mylne paid for Stephen's education, which took place in Scotland (George Watson's College and Edinburgh Academy), London (St Paul's School), and Switzerland (Chillon College, Montreux). He and Mylne generally travelled together, while his mother remained in Scotland and ran a boardinghouse. In 1940, the three of them moved to Melbourne to avoid the war, booking first into the Oriental Hotel then taking a flat in Linden Hall opposite Scotch College which Stephen attended for two terms, and was then accepted into the University of Melbourne to study law.

Second World War
In December 1941, following the end of his first year at university, Stephen enlisted in the Citizens Military Force to serve part-time in the Melbourne University Regiment. Following Japan's entry into the Second World War, Stephen completed full-time military training from 8 December 1941 to 15 February 1942 and was then posted to the 10th Field Regiment, Royal Australian Artillery, serving in Western Australia. He subsequently transferred to the Second Australian Imperial Force. In late 1943, Stephen transferred to the Royal Australian Engineers, serving in New Guinea from April to August 1944 with the 43rd Australian Water Transport Company. He then attended courses, culminating in a commissioning course in April 1945. As a lieutenant, he served in the 41st Australian Landing Craft Company in New Guinea and New Britain. In August 1945, he was posted to Labuan, Borneo, arriving after the war's end and serving there until January 1946. After returning to Australia, he was discharged on 5 February 1946.

Legal career
Stephen completed his studies after the war's end, and was admitted to the Victorian Bar in 1949. By the 1960s, he had become one of Australia's leading constitutional and commercial lawyers. He was made a Queen's Counsel in 1966.

Judicial career
On 30 June 1970, Stephen was appointed as a judge of the Supreme Court of Victoria. He held this position until 29 February 1972, relinquishing it to take up his appointment as a justice of the High Court of Australia. Sworn of the Privy Council of the United Kingdom in 1979 and sat as a member of its Judicial Committee.

Although Stephen was appointed to the High Court by a Liberal government, he proved not to be a traditional conservative upholder of states' rights. He joined the "moderate centre" of the court, between the arch-conservatism of Sir Garfield Barwick and the radicalism of Lionel Murphy. In 1982 he was part of the majority that decided on a broad interpretation of the "external affairs power" of the Australian constitution in the Koowarta v Bjelke-Petersen case.

Governor-general
In March 1982, Prime Minister Malcolm Fraser announced that Queen Elizabeth II had approved his recommendation of Sir Ninian Stephen to succeed Sir Zelman Cowen as Governor-General of Australia. His appointment was praised by both sides of politics. He was sworn in on 29 July 1982, the first former High Court justice to become governor-general since Sir Isaac Isaacs in 1931. When Fraser was defeated by the Labor Party under Bob Hawke in 1983, Stephen had no difficulty working with a Labor government. In 1987, his term was extended by 18 months as a mark of personal respect and also to allow Bill Hayden (to whom Hawke had promised the position) to leave politics at a time of his choosing. Stephen is the only governor-general to have approved two double dissolutions – in 1983 (for Fraser) and 1987 (for Hawke).

Later work

In 1989, Stephen became Australia's first Ambassador for the Environment and, in his three-year term, was particularly energetic in working for a ban of mining in Antarctica. In 1990 he became the chair of the Australian Antarctic Foundation, based in Hobart, and subsequently also became the chair of the Constitutional Centenary Foundation, based in Melbourne, which was established following the 1991 Constitutional Centenary Conference. In 1991, he undertook a   difficult task when he was appointed chairman of the second strand of the Northern Ireland peace talks. From 1991 to 1995, he was a judge ad hoc of the International Court of Justice in the case East Timor (Portugal v. Australia) 1991–1995. From 1993 to 1997, he was a judge on the international tribunals investigating war crimes in Yugoslavia and Rwanda. He also served as chairman of the Australian Citizenship Council from 1998. In 1994, he acted as a special envoy of the UN Secretary General to resolve political conflicts in Bangladesh.

Stephen later moved back into the legal field, becoming president of an arbitral tribunal constituted under Chapter 11 of the North American Free Trade Agreement (NAFTA), charged with the adjudication of an investment dispute between Mondev, a Canadian investor, and the United States.

A detailed scholarly biography of Stephen, Fortunate Voyager by Philip Ayres, was released in September 2013. Drawing upon it, Ayres also summarised Stephen's career for the Victorian Bar News.

Honours

Stephen was made a Knight Commander of the Order of the British Empire (KBE) on 20 April 1972 "for distinguished services to the Law", and sworn of the Privy Council in 1979. As governor-general he was made a Knight of the Order of Australia (AK), Knight Grand Cross of the Order of St Michael and St George (GCMG) and Knight Grand Cross of the Royal Victorian Order (GCVO). In 1994 Queen Elizabeth II appointed him a Knight of the Order of the Garter (KG), being the most recent Australian to be granted a knighthood in the personal gift of the monarch of Australia. He therefore had the unusual distinction of holding five separate knighthoods and joined Lord Casey and Sir Paul Hasluck as one of the few Australian Knights of the Order of the Garter. In 1983 he was named a Commandeur of the French Légion d'honneur.

Stephen delivered the first Sir Ninian Stephen Lecture at the University of Newcastle's law school in 1993, giving his name to this lecture series.

Personal life and death
In June 1949, Stephen married Valery Mary Sinclair (4 July 1925 – 3 November 2019) and they had five daughters. Stephen and his wife were patrons of the Australian Inland Botanic Gardens. He died in Melbourne on 29 October 2017, aged 94. A state funeral for Stephen was held on 8 November at St Paul's Cathedral, Melbourne.

Arms

References

External links

 Supreme Court of Victoria Website
 The Bob Hawke Prime Ministerial Centre website
 Obituary by Geoffrey Robertson, The Guardian
 Australian Senate condolences: 

1923 births
2017 deaths
Military personnel from Oxfordshire
Australian Army officers
Australian Army personnel of World War II
Australian King's Counsel
British emigrants to Australia
Australian people of Scottish descent
Governors-General of Australia
Judges of the Supreme Court of Victoria
Justices of the High Court of Australia
Australian Knights Commander of the Order of the British Empire
Australian Knights Grand Cross of the Order of St Michael and St George
Australian Knights Grand Cross of the Royal Victorian Order
Australian Knights of the Garter
Australian diplomats
Knights of the Order of Australia
Commandeurs of the Légion d'honneur
Melbourne Law School alumni
Australian members of the Privy Council of the United Kingdom
Members of the Judicial Committee of the Privy Council
People educated at Scotch College, Melbourne
People educated at St Paul's School, London
People from South Oxfordshire District
20th-century King's Counsel
International Criminal Tribunal for the former Yugoslavia judges
People educated at George Watson's College
People educated at Edinburgh Academy
Australian judges of United Nations courts and tribunals